The Football Conference season of 1995–96 was the seventeenth season of the Football Conference, also known as the Vauxhall Conference for sponsorship reasons.

Overview
Stevenage Borough, won the Conference championship during their second season in this league. However, they did not earn a promotion to the Football League because they did not meet Football League requirements.

New teams in the league this season
 Hednesford Town (promoted 1994–95)
 Morecambe (promoted 1994–95)
 Slough Town (promoted 1994–95)

Final  league table

Results

Promotion and relegation

Promoted
 Hayes (from the Isthmian League)
 Rushden & Diamonds (from the Southern Premier League)

Relegated
 Dagenham & Redbridge (to the Isthmian League)
 Runcorn (to the Northern Premier League)

Top scorers in order of league goals

References

External links
 1995–96 Conference National Results

National League (English football) seasons
5